Scopula flavissima is a moth of the family Geometridae. It was described by Warren in 1898. It is endemic to Nigeria.

References

Endemic fauna of Nigeria
Moths described in 1898
flavissima
Insects of West Africa
Moths of Africa
Taxa named by William Warren (entomologist)